Días sin luna (English: Days Without Moon) is a Mexican telenovela produced by Juan Osorio for Televisa in 1990. Based on an original script by Eric Vonn.

Angélica Aragón, Sergio Goyri and Gabriela Roel starred as protagonists, Daniela Castro starred as co-protagonist, while the leading actress Ofelia Guilmáin starred as main antagonist. Sylvia Pasquel starred as co-antagonist.

Cast
 
 Angélica Aragón as Lucía Álvarez
 Sergio Goyri as Andrés Monasterios
 Gabriela Roel as Silvia Parlange
 Ofelia Guilmáin as Doña Carlota Parlange Vda. de Escalante-Duval
 Sylvia Pasquel as Laura de Santamaría
 Daniela Castro as Lorena Parlange
 Jorge Russek as Rogelio Santamaría
 Gaston Tusset as Alfonso Parlange
 Lupita Sandoval as Rosario "Chayito"
 Lucía Guilmáin as Lourdes
 Juan Carlos Casasola as Gastón Solís
 Mercedes Olea as Sonia
 Maty Huitrón as Magdalena
 Zaide Silvia Gutiérrez as Irene
 Mario Iván Martínez as Jaime
 Beatriz Cecilia as Olga
 Jair de Rubín as Rodrigo Parlange
 Alejandro Gaytán as Julio Monasterio
 Magda Giner as Teresa "Tere"
 Patricia Bolaños as Marcela
 Miriam Calderón as Cirila
 John Pike as Marcial
 Alicia Brug Alcocer as Graciela "Chelita"
 David Rencoret as Rodolfo Berenice Domínguez as Estíbaliz Gloria Izaguirre
 Leonor Llausás as Clementina Gerardo Moscoso as Lic. Vela Hugo Acosta as Santiago Polo Salazar as Padre Enrique Rosita Pelayo as Clara''
 Perla de la Rosa
 Yanni Contreras
 Héctor Parra

Awards

References

External links

1990 telenovelas
Mexican telenovelas
1990 Mexican television series debuts
1990 Mexican television series endings
Spanish-language telenovelas
Television shows set in Mexico
Televisa telenovelas